Naw Sar Muu Htoo (born 11 November 1953) is a Burmese politician, currently serves as an Amyotha Hluttaw MP for Kayin State No. 11 Constituency. She is a member of the National League for Democracy.

Early life and education 
Htoo was born on 11 November 1953 in Kyainseikgyi, Kayin State, Burma. She is an ethnic Karen.

Political career 
Htoo is a member of the National League for Democracy. In the 2015 Myanmar general election, she was elected as an Amyotha Hluttaw MP from Kayin State No. 11 parliamentary constituency. She also serves as the member of the Amyotha Hluttaw's Farmer Affairs Committee.

References 

National League for Democracy politicians
1953 births
Living people
People from Kayin State
Burmese people of Karen descent